Andrea Gardner (born December 23, 1979) is an American basketball player. She is 191 cm (6'3") tall and weighs 86 kg (190 lb).

Gardner, a center born in Washington, D.C., was drafted in the second round by the Utah Starzz as the 27th overall pick in the 2002 WNBA Draft. She had mostly a reserve role with the team, scoring a career high 14 points on 19 July 2002 against the Orlando Miracle. She then had brief stints with the San Antonio Silver Stars and the Seattle Storm before leaving the WNBA for overseas.

She currently plays in Cyprus. She had previously played for Fenerbahçe İstanbul in Turkey.

Gardner was on the women's basketball team at Howard University, where she was twice named MEAC Player Of The Year (2001 and 2002).

On April 17, 2008, Gardner returned to the WNBA when she signed the Washington Mystics.

Gardner was the assistant coach for Washington Adventist University in 2012 and then left to become the Head Women's basketball coach in the UAE for Sharjah Ladies Club for one season.

After leaving the game of basketball,  Gardner made a life for herself in the human services field by working at Woodstock Job Corps.

Howard statistics

Source

References

External links

1979 births
Living people
American expatriate basketball people in Cyprus
American expatriate basketball people in Turkey
American women's basketball players
Basketball players from Washington, D.C.
Fenerbahçe women's basketball players
Howard Bison women's basketball players
Utah Starzz draft picks
Utah Starzz players
Washington Mystics players
Centers (basketball)